"Johnny Rider" is a song by French singer Johnny Hallyday. It was released as a single and included on his 1974 studio album Rock 'n' Slow.

Composition and writing 
The song was written by Michel Mallory, Sam Bernett, and Jean-Marc Deutère. The recording was produced by Jean Renard.

Commercial performance 
In France the single spent one week at no. 1 on the singles sales chart (in October 1974).

Track listing 
7" single Philips 6009 545 (1974, France etc.)
 A. "Johnny Rider" (3:39)
 B. "Le Bol d'Or" (3:00)

Charts

References

External links 
 Johnny Hallyday – "Johnny Rider" (single) at Discogs

1974 songs
1974 singles
French songs
Johnny Hallyday songs
Philips Records singles
Number-one singles in France
Songs written by Michel Mallory